Cyril Kemp may refer to:

 Cyril Kemp (footballer) (1904–1964), Australian rules footballer
 Cyril Kemp (tennis) (1915–2010), Irish racket sportsperson